The Embassy of the State of Palestine in Maldives is the diplomatic mission of the Palestine in Maldives. The Palestinian ambassador in Malaysia consider same Palestinian ambassador in Philippines.

See also

 List of diplomatic missions of Palestine.

References

Maldives
Maldives–State of Palestine relations
Palestine